Stephen Todd Franz (born April 12, 1976) was a safety in the National Football League. He played professionally for the Cleveland Browns, New Orleans Saints, Green Bay Packers and Washington Redskins.

Biography
Franz was born in Enid, Oklahoma and attended Weatherford High School (Oklahoma). He played college football at the University of Tulsa. He earned a degree in accounting from the University of Tulsa.

He was drafted by the Detroit Lions in the fifth round (145th overall) of the 2000 NFL Draft. Franz played in 46 games over a six-year career.

After leaving the NFL, Franz became a Real Estate Professional in the Oklahoma City Metro Area. He and his wife Tisha have two children and reside in Edmond, Oklahoma.

References

External links 
 databaseFootball.com
 Pro-Football-Reference.com
 SI.com
 edmondoutlook: SPORTS: From Fields to Dreams

1976 births
Living people
Sportspeople from Enid, Oklahoma
American football defensive backs
Tulsa Golden Hurricane football players
Detroit Lions players
Cleveland Browns players
New Orleans Saints players
Green Bay Packers players
Washington Redskins players